Marushkin is a Russian masculine surname, its feminine counterpart is Marushkina. Notable people with the surname include:

Semyon Marushkin (1919–1993), Russian wrestler
Yuri Marushkin (1944–2015), Russian football player and manager

Russian-language surnames